This is a list of "film lists".

Index 

By what:
By title
By when:
By year
By where:
By country
By type:
By source
By genre
By topic
Production:
By cost
By length
By location
By production:
By production company
By copyright status
By availability
By response:
By release style
By response
By revenue

See also

By title

This is an alphabetical list of film articles (or sections within articles about films). It includes made for television films. See the talk page in "A" for the method of indexing used.

By year

Lists of film related events indexed by year of release.

By country

• African films
•  18-0

North Africa
 1-0

•  0-2

 7-67
 9-279
 0-5

• Egyptian films

 0-3
 7-125
 0-4

• Moroccan films

 3-7
 8-73

West Africa
 0-5
 0-5
 1-8
 5-44
 0-9
 2-9
 0-5
 0-1
 0-1
 8-80
 0-2
 3-7
 0-4
 2-18
 0-2
 0-5
 3-23
 0-14
 0-1
 0-3
 2-9
 2-19
 1-11
 0-3
 14-383
 0-18
 0-43

• Nigerian films

 7-47
 0-1
 0-18
 1-4
 0-2
 0-8

Middle Africa
 0-0
 1-13
 2-2
 2-31
 1-12
 1-17
 0-7
 0-2
 0-7
 1-3
 0-9

East Africa
 1-1
 0-2
 0-0
 0-1
 4-19
 0-15
 0-2
 7-51
 1-7
 0-3
 1-6
 0-2
 1-11
 0-2
 1-24
 1-12
 0-6
 0-0
 1-8
 0-12
 0-2
 0-1
 2-10
 0-48
 6-52
 1-8
 2-19
 0-4

South Africa
 0-9
 0-4
 0-7
 0-9
 1-15
 0-2
 13-330
 0-89
 0-1
 0-2
 0-1
 0-24
 0-33

• South African films

 1-3

The Americas
• Latin American films

 3-2
 44-57587
 0-1
 0-1
 0-2
 0-2
 0-1
 0-4
 0-6
 0-14
 0-1

• American Eccentric Cinema
• American films
• New Hollywood films

 27-5183
 4-5
 0-1
 0-24
 0-1

• Canadian films

* 1-8
 0-9

 0-1
 1-20
 0-0
 1-11
 1-6
 0-7
 20-1627
 0-1
 0-5
 0-1
 0-3

• Mexican films

 0-6
 0-12

• Caribbean films

 0-1
 1-5
 0-0
* 0-0
 6-111

• Cuban films

* 2-0
 0-2
 0-0
 2-25
 0-0
* 0-0
 3-15
 0-9
 2-16
* 6-40
 0-0
 0-0
 0-0
 0-12
* 0-0

•  8-0

 23-1908

• Argentine films

 8-28
 0-5
 19-798
 0-2

• Brazilian films

 10-190

• Chilean films

 12-131
 0-1
 0-1

• Colombian films

 3-21
* 0-0
 0-0
 1-20
 0-2
 0-16
 4-66
 0-17
 1-3
 8-44
 12-105
 0-1
 0-4

• Venezuelan films

• Asian films
•  11-0

Central Asia
 3-51
 0-24
 2-16
 0-14
 1-6
 0-4
 0-5
 4-19
 0-30

East Asia
 25-1581
 11-115
 5-776
 0-3
 0-2
 4-1515
 0-1
 0-10
 0-57
 0-2

• Chinese films

 20-1930

• Hong Kong films

 0-0
 28-4252
 4-3808
• Japanese films

 2-25
 23-1593
 4-1559

• South Korean films

 2-19
 0-24
 16-253
 0-1
 0-1
 0-45

• Taiwanese films

West Asia
 2-496

•  12-0

 13-59
 0-45

• Armenian films

 13-45
 1-36

• Azerbaijani films

 0-4
 1-13
 12-82
 0-1
 0-103
 0-1

• Georgian films

 15-576
 2-569

• Iranian films

 3-30
 16-486
 1-373
 1-57

• Israeli films

 2-15
 2-9
 10-86
 0-0
 6-47
 1-26
 4-14
 3-38
 0-4
 14-588
 0-33
 2-542
 0-2

• Turkish films

 6-24
 0-5
†1920~1948† 0-2

South Asia

•  8-0

 8-31
 0-20
 0-2
 0-31
 19-439
 20-1566
 0-2

• Bangladeshi films

 3-13
 0-8
 34-22607
 6-98
 6-98
 0-12
 0-2
 0-2
 6-108
 25-5095
 0-1
 15-1844
 0-9
 1-25
 0-3
 0-2
 0-5
 17-2063
 12-464
 1-104
 0-1
 10-164
 3-15 
 0-5 
 0-9 
 20-4884 
 24-2806 
 2-53‎ 

• Indian films without songs

 5-182

• Maldivian films

 12-194
 0-1
 0-187
 0-4
 0-2

• Nepalese films

 20-471
 0-2
 0-2
 11-437
 0-14
 2-334

• Pakistani films

 12-514
 0-475

• Sri Lankan films

Southeast Asia
 0-3
 12-112
 0-105

• Cambodian films

 13-376
 0-1
 0-1
 1-344
 0-3 
 0-1

• Indonesian films

 0-6
 0-5
 19-233
 14-197

• Malaysian films

 9-280
 0-275

• Burmese films

 22-964
 2-781
 0-453
 0-4

• Philippine films

 12-158

• Singaporean films

 19-320
 3-314

• Thai films

 0-2
 0-2
 14-83
 0-116
†1816~1949† 1-64

• European films

North Europe
 0-2

•  6-0

 38-11099
 144-64711
 0-9
 0-12
 0-23

• British films

 20-862
 2-582

• Danish films
• 

 1-5
 0-4
 11-121
 0-105

• Estonian films

 16-423
 0-322

• Finnish films

 11-135
 0-116

• Icelandic films

 17-442
 0-42

• Irish films

 10-52
 0-36
 11-51
 0-40
 17-544
 2-443
 0-10

• Norwegian films

 21-1112
 3-805

• Swedish films

West Europe
 17-732

• Austrian films

 12-675

• Belgian films

 27-7830
 0-2
 2-6163
 0-1

• French films

 28-4721
 4-3949
 0-2

• German films

†1949~1990† 2-376

• East German films

 9-97
 0-10
 0-0
 24-928
 2-589
 0-2

• Dutch films

 21-401
 0-79

• Swiss films

East Europe
 0-12

•  0-104
•  20-0

 3-33
 0-7
 6-189
 0-160

• Bulgarian films

 15-985
 1-611

• Czech films

†1918~1939/1945~1993† 7-655

• Czechoslovakian films

 20-519
 0-376

• Hungarian films

 2-9
 18-674
 2-498

• Polish films

 15-314
 0-1
 0-267

• Romanian films

 24-1230
 0-9
 0-1
 0-1
 0-1
 0-1
 0-1
 0-2
 0-1
 7-2656
 0-2
 0-1

• Russian films

†1922~1991† 16-1923

• Soviet films

 8-92
 0-69
 16-106
 0-74

• Ukrainian films

South Europe
 0-9
 4-156
 4-80
 0-77
 1-4
 5-51
 0-48
 16-352
 0-302

• Croatian films

 0-0
 10-351
 0-324

• Greek films

 28-6770
 2-4678
 0-2
 1-13

• Italian films
• 

 2-14
 3-37
 0-31
 1-17
 0-7
 3-14
 0-9
 13-264
 0-1
 2-860

• Portuguese films

 0-0
 10-215
 0-48

• Serbian films

 9-67
 0-198
 24-2181
 0-14
 0-61
 0-10
 0-4
 25-5252

• Spanish films

 0-0
 0-44
†1918~1941/1945~1992† 9-426

• Yugoslav films

• Oceanian films

 0-2
 28-2635
 0-2

• Australian films

 0-0
 0-1
 0-1
 21-276
 0-16

• New Zealand films

 0-0
 0-1
* 0-0
* 0-0
* 0-0
 0-1
 0-3
 0-0
 0-0
 1-1
 0-1

By source

Actual
List of films based on actual events
*
List of films based on non-fiction works
*
Depictions of Gautama Buddha in film
*

Traditional: Religion and folklore

List of films based on the Bible
*
*
*
List of films based on Arthurian legend
List of films based on Robin Hood
*
List of films based on Germanic mythology
List of films based on Greco and Roman mythology
*
List of films based on Slavic mythology

Classical
List of films based on Greek drama
List of films based on William Shakespeare works
List of films based on Hamlet
*
*
List of films based on Romeo and Juliet

Fictional

List of films based on fiction works
List of films based on short fiction
List of films based on western fiction
*

Literature
*
List of films based on arts books
List of films based on children's books
List of films based on civics books
List of films based on crime books
List of films based on film books
List of films based on sports books
List of films based on spy books
*
List of National Lampoon films
List of films based on poems

Comics

List of comic-based films directed by women
List of films based on comic strips
List of films based on English-language comics
List of films based on DC Comics
List of films based on Marvel Comics
List of films based on Archie Comics
List of films based on Dark Horse Comics
List of films based on Harvey Comics
List of films based on Image Comics
List of films based on non-English-language comics
List of films based on French-language comics
List of films based on manga

Entertainments
*
*
*
List of films based on video games
*
*
List of films based on operas
List of films based on stage plays or musicals
List of films based on radio series 
List of films based on television shows 
List of films based on toys 
*
*

(*) = Indicates category instead of list based article.

By genre

Plot form
*
*
*
*
*
*
*
List of parody films
List of satirical films
*
List of mystery films
List of film noir titles
List of neo-noir films
*
List of biographical films
*
List of erotic thriller films
*
List of portal fantasy films
*
List of natural horror films
*
List of romantic comedy films
*
List of science fiction comedy films
*
List of children's films
*
List of conspiracy-thriller films

Product form
*
Lists of animated feature films
*
List of computer-animated films
List of live-action animated films
List of puppet films
List of stop motion films
*
List of docufiction films
List of mockumentaries
*
*
Lists of avant-garde films
List of non-narrative films
Psychedelic films
List of 3D films
List of films made with Autodesk 3ds Max
List of 4DX motion-enhanced films
List of ScreenX formatted films
List of 70 mm films
List of black-and-white films produced since 1970
List of black-and-white films that have been colorized
List of early color feature films
List of early wide-gauge films
List of IMAX films
*
List of silent films released on 8 mm or Super 8 mm film
List of three-strip Technicolor films
List of Technirama films
List of Techniscope films
List of VistaVision films
Maximalist films
Minimalist films
Modernist films
Musical films
Nonlinear narrative films
Twin films

By topic

Historical
Historical films
List of classic composers depicted on film
Beethoven in film
List of films about Richard Wagner
*
List of films about the Romanovs
List of films about the Titanic
List of films featuring Hercules
List of films featuring Jesus
List of ninja films
List of pirate films
*
List of Christian films
Mormon cinema
Lists of Western films
List of Euro-Western films
List of Spaghetti Western films
*

National
Filmography of the Ainu
List of cultural references to the September 11 attacks
*
List of documentary films about China
*
*
List of films about the Kibbutz
List of films about Krishna
*
*
*
US presidents in film
*
*
*
List of films about the Romanian Revolution
List of films about Socialism
List of films featuring Kalaripayattu
List of films featuring the Salvation Army
*
List of films featuring Wing Chun
List of Islam-related films
List of films about Muhammad
Sri Lankan Tamils in Indian cinema

Cultural
List of biker films
*
*
Dance in film
List of films about bands
List of films about blues music
*
List of films about pianists
List of punk films
List of films about food and drink
*
*
*
List of films about cooking
*
*
*
*
*
List of films about mathematicians
List of films about philosophers
*
List of visual anthropology films
List of films related to the hippie subculture
*
List of mainstream films with skiing scenes
List of sports films
List of martial arts films
List of mixed martial arts films

Social
List of economics films
*
*
*
*
*
*
*
*
*
*
*
*
*
*
*
*
*
*
List of films that depict class struggle
*
List of drug films
*
*
*
List of films about women's issues
List of films featuring diabetes
List of films featuring domestic violence
List of films featuring the deaf and hard of hearing
List of films featuring home invasions
List of LGBT-related films
List of racism-related films
List of blaxploitation films
*
List of films about the Rwandan genocide
List of films featuring colonialism
*
List of Holocaust films
List of interracial romance films
List of skinhead films
White savior narrative in film
Whitewashing in film
List of trial films

Personal
*
*
*
*
*
*
*
*
*
*
*
*
*
*

Psychological
*
*
*
*
*
*
*
*
*
*
*
List of films featuring mental illness

Nature
List of environmental films
Filmography of environmentalism
*
List of films about horses
*
List of films featuring dinosaurs
List of films featuring eclipses
List of films featuring insects

Digital
List of artificial intelligence films
List of films about automobiles
*
*
*
*
*
List of films about robots and androids
*
*
List of films about Wikipedia
List of films featuring drones
List of films featuring extraterrestrials
List of films featuring fictional films
List of films featuring flying cars
List of films featuring powered exoskeletons
List of films featuring space stations
List of films featuring surveillance

War & Military
List of anti-war films
List of war films and TV specials
List of films about the Czech resistance to Nazi occupation
List of films about nuclear issues
*
Films depicting Latin American military dictatorships
List of films featuring the French Foreign Legion
List of films featuring the Irish Republican Army
List of films featuring the United States Marine Corps
List of films featuring the United States Navy SEALs
List of films featuring the United States Space Force
Submarine films

Creature
*
*
*
*
*
*
*
*
List of werewolf films
*
List of ghost films
List of zombie films
Vampire film
List of monster movies
*
Frankenstein films
List of giant-monster films
List of killer toy films
*

Supernatural
*
List of films about angels
List of films about demons
*
*
List of films about witchcraft
*
List of films featuring invisibility
List of films featuring miniature people
List of films featuring time loops
List of films featuring time travel
List of metafictional films
*
*
Lists of superhero films

Disaster & Dystopia
List of apocalyptic films
*
*
*
List of firefighting films
List of terrorism films
List of dystopian films
List of fiction films about nuclear holocaust
*

By cost

*
List of films using the music of Richard Wagner
*
List of films featuring the destruction of art and cultural heritage
List of films with high frame rates
List of films with longest production time
List of films with overtures
*
List of most expensive films
List of most expensive non-English-language films
List of most expensive Indian films

By length

Long
List of films split into multiple parts
List of longest films
List of longest animated films
List of longest films in India

Short

*
List of animated short films
Animated short film series
List of Looney Tunes feature films
List of Disney animated shorts
List of Pixar shorts
List of one-shot Metro-Goldwyn-Mayer animated shorts
List of Bob Hope short subjects
List of Stella shorts
Short film series
*

By location

Setting

*
*
List of films set around holidays
List of films set in the future
*
List of films set within one day
List of one-location films
List of prison films
Skyscrapers in film
World Trade Center in film

Shooting

*
*
*

By production company

Cast or Crew
List of directorial debuts
List of films Bill Murray was considered to appear in
List of films cut over the director's opposition
List of films director and actor collaborated
List of film director and cinematographer collaborations
*
List of films released posthumously
List of Warren Miller films

Studio
List of films by studio

By copyright status
List of animated films in the public domain in the United States
List of films in the public domain in the United States
List of open-source films

By availability 
*
List of abandoned and unfinished films
List of incomplete or partially lost films
*
List of rediscovered films
List of rediscovered film footage
*

By release style

Series, remakes and spin-offs

Lists of feature film series
List of films produced back-to-back
List of films with post-credit scenes
List of longest running film series and franchises
*
*
List of Disney live-action adaptations and remakes of Disney animated films
List of English-language films with previous foreign-language film versions
*
*
List of fictional shared universes in film

Home viewing or roadshow

List of films broadcast by Horror Channel
*
List of NBC Saturday Night at the Movies titles
*
List of Disney Channel original films
List of Disney television films
List of Hallmark Channel Original Movies
List of Independent Lens films
List of made-for-television films with LGBT characters
List of The Naked Brothers Band films
List of science fiction television films
List of Sesame Workshop productions
List of television films produced for American Broadcasting Company
List of television films produced for UPN
Roadshow theatrical release

Containing mature content
*
*
*
List of films that most frequently use the word fuck
List of Hong Kong Category III films
List of Japanese sexploitation films
List of NC-17 rated films
Unsimulated sex in films

Changed schedule by disaster
List of films affected by the September 11 attacks
List of films impacted by the COVID-19 pandemic

By response

Award

Academy Awards
Academy Award for Best Picture
BAFTA Awards
BAFTA Award for Best Film
Golden Globe Awards
National Board of Review
Palme d'Or

Critical or popular selection

AFI 100 Years... series
100 Movies
100 Laughs
100 Thrills
100 Passions
100 Heroes & Villains
100 Cheers
AFI's 10 Top 10
BFI Top 100 British films
Time Out 100 best British films
Top 10 Canadian Films of All Time
Christian Film Database's top 100
CinemaScore "A+" films & "F" films
Classic 100 Music in the Movies
50 Documentaries to See Before You Die
IDA top 25 documentaries
Bibliotheca Alexandrina's 100 Greatest Egyptian Films
Top 100 Egyptian films
Cahiers du Cinéma's Annual Top 10 Lists
BBC's 100 Greatest Films of the 21st Century
Best in Film: The Greatest Movies of Our Time
List of the 100 Italian films to be saved
List of films considered the best
List of films considered the worst
List of films shown at Butt-Numb-A-Thon
List of films shown at the New York Film Festival
List of films shown at the Sundance Film Festival
List of films spoofed by Mad
List of films with a 100% rating on Rotten Tomatoes
List of films with a 0% rating on Rotten Tomatoes
National Film Registry
Sight & Sound
The Sight & Sound Greatest Films of All Time 2012
Time's All-Time 100 Movies
Vatican's list of films

Adaptation & Cult

List of cult films
List of cultural references to A Clockwork Orange
List of films adapted into comics
List of films adapted into novels
List of films adapted into songs

Banned or condemned
List of banned films
List of films condemned by the Legion of Decency

By revenue

List of fastest-grossing films
List of highest-grossing films
List of film sequels by box-office improvement
List of box office number-one films
List of films with the most weekends at number one
List of biggest box-office bombs

See also

List of libraries
*
*
*